This is a bibliography of works by Max Frisch.

Note: Titles appearing in brackets have not been translated into English so their names are literal translations of the original German titles.

Novels and Novellas

Dramatic Works

Non fiction

Collections in English

Bibliographies by writer
Bibliographies of Swiss writers